

Group A

Abkhazia

Head coach: Beslan Ajinjal

Northern Cyprus

Head coach: Fırat Canova

South Ossetia

Head coach: Ruslan Pukhayev

Kárpátalja

Head coach: Janos Csank

Group B

Padania

Head coach: Arturo Merlo

Ellan Vannin

Head Coach: Chris Bass, Sr

Székely Land

Felvidék

References

CONIFA European Football Cup squads